The Frontier Culture Museum is the biggest open air museum in the Shenandoah Valley. The museum operates on 200 acres of land in Staunton, Virginia, where it  features eleven historic exhibits, to include traditional rural buildings from Europe, Africa, and America.

Overview 

The Old World Exhibits of the Frontier Culture Museum include an Igbo West African Farm, a 17th-century English Farm, an 18th-century Irish Farm, an Irish Forge, and an 18th-century German Farm. Here, costumed living-history interpreters at the museum, including blacksmiths, woodworkers, tailors and yarn spinners, tell the tale of the pioneers that inhabited the frontier of the first permanent British colony in North America. Many of the early immigrants to the Shenandoah Valley were farmers seeking opportunities for a better life. These people eventually became Americans and contributed to the success of the colonies and the United States.

The Museum's growing American Exhibits currently comprise an Eastern Woodland Indian exhibit, a 1760s American Settlement, an 1820s American Farm, an 1850s American Farm, the Mount Tabor Church, and an Early American Schoolhouse. These exhibits contributed to making the museum one of the highest rated family-friendly attractions and one of the top tourist destinations in Virginia. In 2021, it was rated the best museum in the Shenandoah Valley by Virginia Living and by the Daily News-Record.

The house later known as the Worcestershire House was a very old house in Hartlebury, England, dismantled and re-assembled at the Frontier Culture Museum of Virginia, in 1992. The John Smith (Smyth or Smythe) family built it in the 1630s. An example of the Tudor frame variety of timber framing construction, it was dismantled in 1970 and shipped.

See also 
 Open-air museum

References

External links

African-American history of Virginia
Ethnic museums in Virginia
History museums in Virginia
Igbo-American history
Institutions accredited by the American Alliance of Museums
Open-air museums in Virginia
Living museums in Virginia
English-American culture in Virginia
Farm museums in Virginia
German-American culture in Virginia
Irish-American culture in Virginia
Museums in Staunton, Virginia
Native American history of Virginia
European-American museums